Joseph Bell (born September 15, 1957) is a former American football defensive end who played for the 1979 Oakland Raiders of the National Football League. Joe also played for the 1980 Winnipeg Blue Bombers of the Canadian Football League. He played college football at Norfolk State University.

Joe Bell earned both athletic and academic honors at Norfolk State University. In academic, he was chosen 1979 CIAA Conference Scholar Athlete of the Year. Joe graduated with a 3.5 GPA in Electrical Engineering. As an athlete, Joe Bell demonstrated excellence by being named to both the 1979 CIAA  All-Conference Sportswriters and Coaches football teams and AP All-American Team (honorable mention). He also served as football co-captain.

References 

Living people
1956 births
American football defensive ends
Norfolk State Spartans football players
Oakland Raiders players
Winnipeg Blue Bombers players